Jermaine Eric Shute (born December 15, 1984), better known by his stage name Starlito (formerly All $tar Cashville Prince) is an American rapper and businessman. He gained his first national look for the 2005 song "Grey Goose", which featured artists Young Jeezy and Yo Gotti. His second single, released in 2007, was "Champagne Crazy", featuring then labelmate Lil Wayne. His third radio single was "I Go Ham" and would later also feature rapper Gucci Mane. During 2013 alone, Starlito's albums appeared on the Billboard Top 200 albums chart three times in a four-month span (Cold Turkey, Stepbrothers Two, and Fried Turkey). On March 15, 2017, Starlito and Don Trip released their Stepbrothers Three project, which was followed by a 43-city United States tour.

Discography 
Vol.1 It Ain't A Game No More (2002)
Vol.2 Who The Hell is All-Star? (2003)
Vol.3 It's About Business (2003)
Vol.4 Hatin' Ain't Healthy (2003)
Vol.5 Got Mine Get Yours (2005)
Prince of the Ville: Underground vol. 1 (2005)
Starlito's Way: I Am Not Your Friend (2007)
The Tenn-A-Keyan (2007)
Starlito's Way II 2 disc album December 15 a Star Was Born & Internal Affairs (2008)
Star & Gotti (with Yo Gotti) (2008)
StarBucks (with Young Buck) (2008)
The S.Lito Files (2008)
The Ten-A-Keyan 2 (2009)
I Love You Too (2009)
I Love You, Too Much:The Necessary Evils (2009)
I Still Love You: From The Back Of Class (2009)
The Tenn-A-Keyan 3 (comics, sports, crimes & courts) (2009)
Free At Last (2010)
Living in The Past (with Dolewite & Scooby) (2010)
Terminator Gold 60 (2010)
The Tenn-A-Keyan 3.5 (Ill Shoot Through Ya) (2010)
Renaissance Gangster (2010)
Starlito's Way 3: Life Insurance (2010)
@ WAR w/ myself (2011)
Step Brothers (with Don Trip) (2011)
Ultimate Warrior (2011)
#UW: Separation Anxiety (2011)
For My Foes (2012)
Mental WARfare (2012)
Post Traumatic Stress (2012)
Produced by Coop: The Starlito Tape (2012)
Funerals & Court Dates (2012)
Attention, Tithes, & Taxes (2013)
Cold Turkey (2013)
Step Brothers Two (with Don Trip) (2013)
Fried Turkey (2013)
Insomnia Addict (2013)
Theories (2014)
Black Sheep Don't Grin (2014)
Introversion (2015)
Passed the Present (2015)
I'm Moving to Houston (2015)
Red Dot Free (2016)
Step Brothers (Karate in the Garage) (2017)
Manifest Destiny (2017)
Step Brothers THREE (with Don Trip) (2017)
Attention, Tithes & Taxes 2: Gentrifried (2017)
Hot Chicken (2017)
GhettOut: Funerals & Court Dates 2 (2017)
GhettOut: Insomnia Addict 2 (2017)
Starlito's Way 4: GhettOut (2017)
At WAR with Myself Too (2018)
Open Cases "duo album with MobSquadNard" (2018)
 TrapStar "duo album with TrapperMan Dale" (2018)
Paternity Leave (2020)

References

External links 
Starlito Billboard artist profile

1984 births
Gangsta rappers
Living people
African-American male rappers
Cash Money Records artists
People from Nashville, Tennessee
Rappers from Tennessee
Southern hip hop musicians
21st-century American rappers
21st-century American male musicians
21st-century African-American musicians
20th-century African-American people